Xia Changliang (born 1 April 1968) is a Chinese engineer and administrator currently serving as president of Tiangong University. He is an academician of the Chinese Academy of Engineering (CAE).

Biography
Xia was born in Tianjin, on 1 April 1968. He earned a B.S. degree from Tianjin University in 1990 and an M.S. and a Ph.D degree from Zhejiang University in 1993 and 1995, respectively. After graduating in 1996, he stayed at the university, becoming a professor at the School of Electrical and Automation Engineering in 2002. In April 2010, he became vice president of Tiangong University, rising to president in October 2018. On 24 January 2018, he became a member of the 13th National Committee of the Chinese People's Political Consultative Conference.

Honours and awards 
 2011 State Science and Technology Progress Award (Second Class)
 2012 Guanghua Engineering Science and Technology Award (Youth Award)
 2013 State Technological Invention Award (Second Class)
 27 November 2017 Member of the Chinese Academy of Engineering (CAE)

References 

1968 births
Living people
Engineers from Tianjin
Tianjin University alumni
Zhejiang University alumni
Presidents of Tiangong University
Members of the Chinese Academy of Engineering